Newport High School is a comprehensive public high school serving students in grades nine through twelve in Newport, Arkansas, United States. It is the sole high school administered by the Newport School District.

Academics 
The assumed course of study at Newport High School exceeds the Smart Core curriculum developed by the Arkansas Department of Education (ADE). Students engage in regular and Advanced Placement (AP) coursework and exams to obtain at least 24 units beyond the 22 units required by the Smart Core curriculum. Exceptional students have been recognized as National Merit Finalists and participated in Arkansas Governor's School.

Athletics 
The school's mascot is the Greyhound with black and orange as the school colors.

For 2020–21, the Newport Greyhounds compete in the state's 3A classification within the 3A West Conference of the Arkansas Activities Association (AAA).  The Pointers engage in numerous interscholastic activities, including baseball, basketball (boys/girls), cross country (boys/girls), football, golf, track, soccer, softball, tennis (boys/girls), and volleyball, along with marching band, cheer, and dance.

Building
The main building of the high school was designed by Thompson, Sanders & Ginnochio and built in 1930.  It is one of the firm's few Art Deco designs, and was listed on the National Register of Historic Places in 1982.

Notable alumni 
 Kaneaster Hodges, Jr. (1956)—Politician; U.S. Senator (1977–79).
 Bo Lacy, American football player

See also

List of high schools in Arkansas
National Register of Historic Places listings in Jackson County, Arkansas

References

External links
 

Public high schools in Arkansas
Schools in Jackson County, Arkansas
School buildings on the National Register of Historic Places in Arkansas
National Register of Historic Places in Jackson County, Arkansas
Newport, Arkansas